Atkinson is an incorporated town in Henry County, Illinois, United States. The population was 965 at the 2020 census, down from 972 in 2010.

Geography
Atkinson is located at  (41.418770, -90.014626).

Demographics

As of the census of 2000, there were 1,001 people, 432 households, and 276 families residing in the town. The racial makeup of the town was 98.5% White, 0.4% African American, 0.1% Asian, 0.3% from other races, and 0.7% from two or more races. Hispanic or Latino of any race were 1.2% of the population.

There were 432 households, out of which 28.5% had children under the age of 18 living with them, 55.1% were married couples living together, 5.6% had a female householder with no husband present, and 35.9% were non-families. 32.2% of all households were made up of individuals, and 19.2% had someone living alone who was 65 years of age or older.  The average household size was 2.32 and the average family size was 2.94.

In the town, the population was spread out, with 23.7% under the age of 18, 7.7% from 18 to 24, 26.7% from 25 to 44, 22.1% from 45 to 64, and 19.9% who were 65 years of age or older.  The median age was 40 years. For every 100 females, there were 92.9 males.  For every 100 females age 18 and over, there were 91.5 males.

The median income for a household in the town was $35,750, and the median income for a family was $47,422. Males had a median income of $34,500 versus $22,083 for females. The per capita income for the town was $17,732.  About 5.6% of families and 10.0% of the population were below the poverty line, including 11.8% of those under age 18 and 11.7% of those age 65 or over.

References

External links
Atkinson official website

1867 establishments in Illinois
Populated places established in 1867
Towns in Henry County, Illinois
Towns in Illinois